Servílio de Jesus Filho (15 October 1939 – 8 June 2005), also known as "Servílio", was a Brazilian football striker who played for several clubs in the Campeonato Brasileiro Série A. He also had a brief spell in the Mexican Primera División.

Career
Born in São Paulo, Servílio was a product of the Associação Portuguesa de Desportos youth system. He began playing professional football with Associação Desportiva Araraquara before he returned to play for Portuguesa's senior side in 1957.

Servílio enjoyed his greatest success with his next club, Sociedade Esportiva Palmeiras. He won the Campeonato Paulista twice (in 1963 and 1966) and Campeonato Brasileiro Série A in 1967 (Torneio Roberto Gomes Pedrosa) and 1967 (Taça Brasil).

Servílio moved to Mexico to play for Club Atlas during the 1970–71 season. He returned to Brazil for a few seasons with Paulista Futebol Clube and Nacional Atlético Clube and finished his career in Venezuela playing for Valencia F.C.

Servílio died from a heart attack in São Paulo at age 65.

References

External links

1939 births
2005 deaths
Brazilian footballers
Brazil international footballers
Brazilian expatriate footballers
Campeonato Brasileiro Série A players
Liga MX players
Associação Portuguesa de Desportos players
Sociedade Esportiva Palmeiras players
Sport Club Corinthians Paulista players
Paulista Futebol Clube players
Nacional Atlético Clube (SP) players
Atlas F.C. footballers
Expatriate footballers in Mexico
Association football forwards
Footballers from São Paulo